Loïs Boisson (born 16 May 2003) is a French tennis player.

Boisson has a career high WTA singles ranking of 1275, achieved on 22 March 2021.

Boisson made her WTA main draw debut at the 2021 Lyon Open (WTA), where she received a wildcard into the doubles main draw, partnering Juline Fayard.

ITF Finals

Singles: 1 title

References

External links

2003 births
Living people
French female tennis players